F'Dech Fo's Tomb is a 1981 fantasy role-playing game adventure published by Judges Guild.

Contents
F'Dech Fo's Tomb is a collection of adventure scenarios in set locations, with a tomb consisting of five rooms, two venues containing a treasure, and one with a lich.

Reception
Lewis Pulsipher reviewed F'Dech Fo's Tomb in The Space Gamer No. 52. Pulsipher commented that "Even at [a lower price], this booklet is a waste of money."

See also 

Glory Hole Dwarven Mine, 1981
Heroic Expeditions, 1981
Lara's Tower, 1981

References

Judges Guild fantasy role-playing game adventures
Role-playing game supplements introduced in 1981